The 1987 Brownlow Medal was the 60th year the award was presented to the player adjudged the fairest and best player during the Victorian Football League (VFL) home and away season. Tony Lockett of the St Kilda Football Club and John Platten of the Hawthorn Football Club both won the medal by polling twenty votes during the 1987 VFL season.

The Count was notable for the first use of theme from The Untouchables as the winner's theme, which has subsequently been used every year since.

It remains the first and only time a full-forward (Lockett) won the award in the history of the medal.

Leading votegetters 

* The player was ineligible to win the medal due to suspension by the VFL Tribunal during the year.

References 

Brownlow Medal
1987